The 2018 Vinaphone Cup (also known as the tenth edition of VFF Cup) is an international Olympic association football friendly tournament, sponsored by Vietnam Posts and Telecommunications Group (VNPT) with the competition is named after Vinaphone, a subsidiary-mobile network which is part of VNPT. Vietnam as the hosts use the tournament as their preparation for the Asian Games held in Indonesia.

Vietnam emerged as the tournament champions with 7 points ahead the rest teams.

Participating teams 
The following are the list of teams participating the tournament.

Match officials 
The following referees and their assistants were chosen for the tournament.

Referees

  Nazmi Nasaruddin
  Suhaizi Shukri
  Hoàng Ngọc Hà
  Nguyễn Hiền Triết

Assistant referees

  Azman Ismail
  Yusri Muhamad

Regulation 
The tournament is decided through a round-robin format with team with the highest point will become the winner.

Prize money 
Prize money amounts were announced in July 2018.

Venue 
All matches were to be played in National Stadium, Hanoi.

Standings

Results 
 Times listed are local, Vietnam standard time (UTC+7).

Goalscorers 
2 goals

  Oday Dabbagh
  Nurillo Tukhtashinov

1 goal

  Zahir Sulaman
  Mohammed Obaid
  Omar El Cherif
  Nguyễn Anh Đức
  Phan Văn Đức
  Đoàn Văn Hậu
  Nguyễn Công Phượng

References

External links 
 

VFF Cup
International association football competitions hosted by Vietnam
2018 in Vietnamese football
August 2018 sports events in Asia